You Are What You Eat is a 1968 American counterculture semi-documentary movie that attempts to capture the essence of the 1960s flower power hippie era and the Haight-Ashbury scene. The film features locally known personalities, including well known and somewhat mythical pot dealer Super Spade (Bill Powell Jr) and musicians of the day, including Tiny Tim, David Crosby and Peter Yarrow, and radio disc jockey, Rosko.

The film soundtrack features music by John Simon and by artists as diverse as Paul Butterfield, The Electric Flag, Eleanor Barooshian, Peter Yarrow, John Herald and Harpers Bizarre, accompanied by several members of The Band.

The film was preserved and restored by Ed Carter at the archive of the Academy of Motion Picture Arts & Sciences.

Soundtrack
You Are What You Eat – Columbia OS-3240 – 1968
You Are What You Eat – Sony Records, Japan, SRCS-8522 – 1997

1. Rosko - Teenage Fair
Bass – Bill Crow
Drums – Bill Lavorgna
Vocals – Nancy Pliday, Peter Yarrow
Vocals, Organ, Ondiolin – John Simon

2. Peter Yarrow- Moments Of Soft Persuasion
Electric Piano – John Simon
Vocals, Acoustic Guitar – Peter Yarrow

3. Peter Yarrow- Silly Girl
Bass – Bill Crow
Organ – John Simon
Vocals, Acoustic Guitar – Peter Yarrow

4. John Simon - Desert Moog Music
Guitar – Al Gorgoni
Percussion – Peter Yarrow
Percussion, Moog, Ondiolin – John Simon

5. Tiny Tim - Be My Baby
Bass – Rick Danko
Guitar – Robbie Robertson
Organ – Garth Hudson
Piano – Richard Manuel
Vocals – Tiny Tim

6. John Herold - The Family Dog
Backing Vocals – Peter Yarrow
Bass – Bill Crow
Drums – Bill Lavorgna
Piano, Backing Vocals – John Simon
Vocals – John Herald

7. Hamsa El Din - The Nude Dance
Uood – H. El Din

8. John Simon - My Name Is Jack
Bass – Bill Crow
Drums – Bill Lavorgna
Piano – Paul Griffin
Vocals, Piano – John Simon

9. Tiny Tim & Eleanor Baruchian - I Got You Babe
Bass – Rick Danko
Guitar – Robbie Robertson
Organ – Garth Hudson
Piano – Richard Manuel
Vocals – Eleanor Baruchian, Tiny Tim

10. Paul Butterfield - You Are What You Eat
Bass – Bill Crow
Drums – Bill Lavorgna
Harmonica, Vocals – Paul Butterfield
Organ – Paul Griffin

11. John Simon - Beach Music
Bass – Bill Crow
Drums – Bill Lavorgna
Piano – John Simon

12. Peter Yarrow / John Simon - The Wabe
Bass – Bill Crow
Organ – Paul Griffin
Vocals – John Simon, Peter Yarrow

13. Peter Yarrow - Don't Remind Me Now Of Time
Harpsichord – John Simon
Vocals, Acoustic Guitar – Peter Yarrow

14. John Simon	- Painting For Freakout
Bass – Bill Crow
Drums – Bill Lavorgna
Piano – John Simon

15. John Simon / The Electric Flag - Freakout
Bass – Harvey Brooks
Drums – Buddy Miles
Guitar – Mike Bloomfield
Moog, Ondiolin – John Simon
Alto Saxophone – Stemsy Hunter
Tenor Saxophone, Organ – Herbie Rich
Trumpet – Marcus Doubleday

Tracks 1, 2, 3, 10, 12 & 13 Written by John Simon and Peter Yarrow
Tracks 4, 6, 8, 11 & 14 Written by John Simon
Track 5 Written by Jeff Barry, Ellie Greenwich & Phil Spector
Track 7 Written by Hamsa El Din
Track 9 Written by Sonny Bono
Track 15 Written by John Simon & The Electric Flag

See also
List of American films of 1968

References

External links
You Are What You Eat imdb Combined Details
You Are What You Eat -  The VIDEO BEAT!
WMFU's Beware of the Blog April 29, 2007 You Are What You Eat

1968 films
American documentary films
Hippie films
Documentary films about San Francisco
1960s English-language films
1960s American films